Rusu is a common Moldavian and Romanian surname. Notable people with the surname include:
Adrian Rusu (born 1984), Romanian football player
Adrian Andrei Rusu (born 1951), Romanian archeologist
Alexandru Rusu (1884–1963), Romanian bishop of the Greek-Catholic Church
Bogdan Rusu (born 1990), Romanian football player 
Denis Rusu (born 1990), Moldovan football goalkeeper
Emil Rusu (born 1946), Romanian cyclist
Jason Rusu (born 1969), Canadian sprint canoer
Marius Rusu (born 1990), Romanian football player
Mirela Rusu  (born 1978), Romanian aerobic gymnast
Răzvan Rusu (born 1988), Romanian weightlifter
Ștefan Rusu (born 1956), Romanian wrestler 
Svetlana Rusu (born 1972), Moldovan politician
Victor Rusu (born 1953), Moldovan politician, journalist and activist
Vlad Rusu (born 1990), Romanian football player

Surnames of Moldovan origin
Romanian-language surnames